The 1961 All-Ireland Senior Hurling Championship was the 75th staging of the All-Ireland hurling championship since its establishment by the Gaelic Athletic Association in 1887. The championship began on 16 April 1961 and ended on 3 September 1961.

Wexford were the defending champions, however, they were defeated in the provincial championship. Tipperary won the title after defeating Dublin by 0-16 to 1-12 in the All-Ireland final.

Format

All-Ireland Championship

Final: (1 match) The two provincial representatives from Leinster and Munster made up the two final teams with the winners being declared All-Ireland champions.

Results

Leinster Senior Hurling Championship

First round

Quarter-final

Semi-final

Final

Munster Senior Hurling Championship

Quarter-finals

Semi-finals

Final

All-Ireland Senior Hurling Championship

Final

Championship statistics

Scoring statistics

Top scorers overall

Top scorers in a single game

Miscellaneous

 The Munster final between Cork and Tipperary breaks all previous attendance records. An official crowd of 62,175 is the biggest ever attendance recorded at a sporting event outside of Croke Park in Dublin. An unofficial attendance, due to spectators storming the gates, meant that the crowd could have been as high as 70,000 or more. It remains a record for a Munster decider.
 Westmeath are the top-scoring team in the championship for the first and only (as at 2021) time in their history.
 They are also the first team to be the top scorers in a championship year, yet have a negative score difference. As of July 2021, the only other team to do so would be Waterford (2008).

Sources

 Corry, Eoghan, The GAA Book of Lists (Hodder Headline Ireland, 2005).
 Donegan, Des, The Complete Handbook of Gaelic Games (DBA Publications Limited, 2005).
 Sweeney, Éamonn, Munster Hurling Legends (The O'Brien Press, 2002).

References

1961
All-Ireland Senior Hurling Championship